Mestalla Stadium is a football stadium in Valencia, Spain. The stadium is the home of Valencia Club de Fútbol and has a capacity of 49,430 seats, making it the 8th-largest stadium in Spain, and the largest in the Valencian Community. The stadium's name originates from the historic irrigation canal of Mestalla, which was originally outside the south stand of the stadium and had to be jumped over in order to get to the ground. The North Stand of the stadium is known for its very steep section.

History
The Estadio Mestalla was inaugurated with a friendly match on 20 May 1923 between Valencia CF and Levante UD. The new stadium had a capacity of 17,000 spectators, which was increased to 25,000 four years later. During the Civil War, the Mestalla was used as a concentration camp and storage warehouse. It would only keep its structure, since the rest was an empty plot of land with no terraces and a grandstand damaged during the war. 

During the 1950s, the Mestalla was renovated, resulting in a stadium with a seating capacity of 60,000 spectators. It was severely damaged by the flood of October 1957 when the Turia River broke its banks. The stadium soon returned to operational use with some more improvements, such as the addition of artificial lighting, and was inaugurated during the 1959 Fallas festivities.

In 1969, the stadium's name was changed to Estadio Luis Casanova, to honour club president Luis Casanova Giner. The change lasted for a quarter of a century, when Casanova admitted that he was completely overwhelmed by such an honour and requested in 1994 that the stadium's name be returned to Mestalla.

1972 saw the inauguration of the club's head office, located in the back of the numbered terraces. It consisted of an office designed in the avant-garde style with a trophy hall, which held the flag the club was founded on. The summer of 1973 ushered in another change at Mestalla, the introduction of goal seats, which meant the elimination of fourteen rows of standing room terraces.

Future 
A replacement stadium, Nou Mestalla, started construction in 2007, but is yet to be completed. The new stadium is due to have a capacity of 61,500.

Internationals and Cup Finals
Mestalla held the Spain national football team for the first time in 1925. It was chosen the national team's group venue when Spain staged the 1982 World Cup, and at the 1992 Summer Olympics held in Barcelona, all of Spain's matches up to the final were held at Mestalla, as they won Gold.

Mestalla has been the setting for important international matches, has held nine cup finals, has also been a temporary home for Levante UD, home of the Spain national football team and exile for Castellón and Real Madrid in the European Cup. Mestalla hosted four El Clásico finals in Copa del Rey between Barcelona and Real Madrid, with 1936, 1990, 2011 and 2014. In total the stadium hosted ten Copa del Rey finals with the first one played in 1926.

1982 FIFA World Cup
The stadium was one of the venues of the 1982 FIFA World Cup (known as Luis Casanova Stadium at the time of the tournament), and held the following matches:

Transport 
Metro:

Aragón station (Lines 5 and 7) Metrovalencia

Facultats station (Lines 3 and 9) Metrovalencia

Bus lines:

Amadeo of Savoia street in: line 32.

Reyes Prosper street: line 71.

Avenida de Aragón: lines 10, 12, 80, 41 and 79

Avenida Blasco Ibáñez: lines 10, 29, 30, 31, 71, 79, 81, 89 and 90.

References

External links

 The new Mestalla
 Estadios de España 

Valencia CF
Football venues in Valencia
1982 FIFA World Cup stadiums
Venues of the 1992 Summer Olympics
Olympic football venues
Tourist attractions in Valencia
Sports venues completed in 1923
1923 establishments in Spain
Buildings and structures in Valencia